The Crossroads (officially the Crossroads Arts District) is a neighborhood within Greater Downtown with a population of 7,491. It is centered at approximately 19th Street and Baltimore Avenue, directly south of the Downtown Loop and north of Crown Center. It is the city's main art gallery district and center for the visual arts. Dozens of galleries are located in its renovated warehouses and industrial buildings. It is also home to numerous restaurants, housewares shops, architects, designers, an advertising agency, and other visual artists. The district also has several live music venues.

Numerous buildings in the neighborhood are listed on the National Register of Historic Places, including the TWA Corporate Headquarters Building, Western Auto Building, and Firestone Building. There are two historic groups of buildings also on the Register—Working Class Hotels at 19th & Main Streets (Midwest Hotel, Monroe Hotel, and Rieger Hotel) and Crossroads Historic Freight District (industrial buildings clustered along the tracks north of Union Station).

The Crossroads district is also home to one of the county's largest remaining examples of a Film Row district. The Film Row district consists of 17 buildings. Following the demolition of a Film Row building, the Film Row district was placed on Missouri Preservation's 2013 list of "watched properties."

The Kansas City Star and The Pitch maintain offices in the neighborhood, along with HOK and Barkley. The Belger Arts Center is also located in the district.

First Fridays

Art galleries generally open new shows on the first Friday of each month from 6 to 9 pm. This has become one of the region's most popular regular events as thousands of people flock to the Crossroads for gallery "open houses" amidst the Crossroad's unique atmosphere.

Crossroads Music Festival
First held in late August 2005, the Crossroads Music Festival is an annual event organized by Spice of Life Productions, which features local music artists. The 2005 event was held at Grinder's Sculpture Park (Crossroads KC) at 18th Street and Locust Street. In addition to concert performances, offerings include short films by local independent filmmakers and booths offering apparel by local designers, local independent print media, and carnival games.

Tax abatements
In 2007, one of Kansas City's development agencies began a program to allow property tax abatements for art-related business who would otherwise be priced out of the neighborhood by fast-rising property values. Neighborhood leaders lobbied for the program to prevent the "Soho Effect" of gentrification. Tax abatements had been granted to developers to attract new residents to the neighborhood with high-end condominiums and lofts next to the galleries.

See also
List of neighborhoods in Kansas City, Missouri
List of points of interest in Kansas City, Missouri
North Village Arts District

References

External links
 Crossroads Community Association
 Nicholson Group Vision for this area
 Map: 

 
Culture of Kansas City, Missouri
Neighborhoods in Kansas City, Missouri
Entertainment districts in the United States
Tourist attractions in Kansas City, Missouri
Arts districts
Downtown Kansas City